Dmitri Kuznetsov may refer to:

 Dmitri Kuznetsov (footballer, born 1965), association football coach and former player
 Dmitri Anatolyevich Kuznetsov (born 1972), retired Russian footballer
 Dmitry Kuznetsov (politician) (born 1975), Russian politician
 Husky (rapper) (born 1993), stage name of Russian rapper Dmitry Nikolayevich Kuznetsov